Jerry J. Welter (born February 17, 1935) is an American politician in the state of Iowa.

Welter was born in Monticello, Iowa. A Republican, he served in the Iowa House of Representatives from 1993 to 2001 (56th district).

References

1935 births
Living people
People from Jones County, Iowa
Farmers from Iowa
Republican Party members of the Iowa House of Representatives